The Paatsjoki River (Paz or Patsoyoki) is a river that flows through Finland, Norway, and Russia.  
Since 1826, the river has marked parts of the Norway–Russia border, except from 1920 to 1944 when it was along the Finland–Norway border.

The river is the outlet from the large Lake Inari in Finland and flows through Norway and Russia to discharge into the Bøkfjorden (which later flows into the Varangerfjorden and then the Barents Sea), not far from the town of Kirkenes. A series of hydroelectric stations, known as the Paatsjoki River Hydroelectric Plants, are along the river.

The river provides good fishing opportunities for Atlantic salmon, although fishermen must ensure that their fishing lines do not cross the international border.

References

External links

 
Rivers of Finland
Rivers of Troms og Finnmark
Rivers of Murmansk Oblast
International rivers of Europe
Norway–Russia border
Rivers of Inari, Finland
Rivers of Norway
Border rivers